John Doran (born 16 May 1978) is a former professional tennis player from Ireland.

Doran played in 12 Davis Cup ties for Ireland between 1996 and 2004. He had an 8/6 record in singles and was 5/3 in doubles.

His best result on tour came at a Challenger tournament in 2002, at Gosford, Australia, where he and Andrew Painter were doubles runners-up.

He is a graduate from Harvard University.

References

External links
 
 

1978 births
Living people
Irish male tennis players
Harvard Crimson men's tennis players
Harvard University alumni